Statilia apicalis is a far-ranging species of mantis found in Asia, Africa, and Oceania.

Its range includes Australia, New Guinea, New Caledonia, India, Sulawesi, China, Sumba, Timor, the Philippines, Ghana, Guinea, and the Congo River area.

See also
List of mantis genera and species

References

External links
 Photos of an adult male Statilia apicalis

Mantidae
Mantodea of Africa
Mantodea of Asia
Mantodea of Oceania
Insects of Australia
Insects of Cameroon
Insects of China
Insects of the Democratic Republic of the Congo
Insects of Timor
Insects of West Africa
Insects of India
Insects of Indonesia
Insects of Japan
Insects of Korea
Insects of Malaysia
Insects of New Caledonia
Insects of New Guinea
Insects of the Philippines
Insects of the Republic of the Congo
Insects of Thailand
Insects of Vietnam
Insects described in 1871